Hınıs (Khnus) is a town and district of Erzurum Province in the Eastern Anatolia Region of Turkey. The population is 9,792 (as of 2010). Historical monuments in the town include the castle and the Ulu Cami Mosque, said to be built in 1734 by Alaeddin, the bey of Muş. The town is populated by Kurds.

The district, which is 150 km away from Erzurum to the south, that is to Muş, is very close to the Hamurpert Lake, which has an important place in history, with its location close to the Bingöl mountains. The other districts of the province, Karayazı, Karaçoban and Tekman, are the neighboring districts of Hınıs. In addition, the Varto district of Muş is only 50 km from Hınıs. Hınıs is a plain district and Hınıs Plain is one of the most fertile plains of the region. Therefore, agriculture and animal husbandry are the main sources of income in the district. It has the same characteristics as Erzurum in terms of climate and nature. Winters are cold and snowy, and summers are generally cool. In general, it can be said that it is 5-6 degrees warmer than Erzurum.

Geography
The Hınıs plain is an upland plain centered on a tributary of the Murat Su. A range of hills on the south separates the Hınıs plain from the Murat Su. On the southwest, the Hınıs plain is separated from the Varto plain by a series of hills and steep valleys. To the north is a range of pyramid-shaped hills called the Ak Dağ, or White Mountains, which are in turn connected to the Bingöl Dağ further west by a plateau called the Menge Dağ. The Menge Dağ forms the northwestern border of the Hınıs plain; from its foothills, Şüphan Dağ is visible over the hills to the southeast. The Hınıs plain consists of two distinct, gently undulating bands that are occasionally broken up by low-lying hills. The valley has fertile soil and has historically formed a breeding ground for sheep and horses.

The town of Hınıs itself lies near the upper end of the valley, on a volcanic table raised above the surrounding plain. At this end, several smaller streams join together into the plain's main river.

History
The Hınıs plain formed the main part of the early medieval Armenian canton of Varazhnunik. During this period (roughly the 4th through 7th centuries), Hınıs was probably a fortified market town. Later, after the Arab conquest of Armenia, the region became divided into several small principalities. Hınıs was "almost certainly" the capital of one of these principalities, which was called Sermatz in Greek sources. Sermatz seems to have covered the old district of Varazhnunik as well as the Varto plain to the southwest. Its rulers were probably vassals of the Kaysite emirs of Malazgirt.

During the Kara Koyunlu period, Hınıs was the capital of a small Kurdish emirate which was a vassal of the emirate of Bitlis, which was in turn a vassal of the Kara Koyunlu themselves. The emirate of Hınıs was mainly based on the Hınıs plain but also extended south of the Murat Su to include Lake Nazik and the area around Bulanık. Later, under the Ottoman Empire, Hınıs formed a sanjak of Erzurum Eyalet.

Monuments

Castle
Hınıs's old castle crowns a small rocky promontory jutting out above a depression in the middle of the plateau. The castle rock is only accessible on one side, by an elevated "neck" connecting it to the rest of the plateau. This "neck" was the starting point for the walls that historically surrounded the town. Only a couple of towers of the castle remain intact today.

Mosque
The Ulu Cami is beneath the castle rock and outside the town. It dates to 1734 and is traditionally attributed to Ala ed-Din, the bey of Muş who also fortified Mercimek Kale on the Muș plain. The mosque is roughly cube-shaped, with one relatively small pyramidal cap crowning the roof, surrounded by 8 smaller domes. The mosque has one, black-and-white striped minaret, on the northwest corner.

Neighbourhoods

 Acarköy
 Akbayır
 Akçamelik
 Akgelin
 Akgöze
 Akören
 Alaca
 Alagöz
 Alikırı
 Alınteri
 Altınpınar
 Arpaderesi
 Aşağı Kayabaşı
 Avcılar
 Bahçe
 Başköy
 Bayır
 Bellitaş
 Beyyurdu
 Burhan
 Çakmak
 Çamurlu
 Çatak
 Çilligöl
 Dağçayır
 Demirci
 Derince
 Dervişali
 Dibekli
 Dikili
 Divanhüseyin
 Elmadalı
 Erbeyli
 Erduran
 Erence
 Esenli
 Göller
 Gülistan
 Güllüçimen
 Gürçayır
 Güzeldere
 Halilçavuş
 Hayran
 Ilıcak
 İsmail
 Kalecik
 Karaağaç
 Karabudak
 Karakula
 Karamolla
 Kazancı
 Ketenci
 Kısık
 Kızılahmet
 Kızmusa
 Kolhisar
 Kongur
 Köprübaşı
 Meydan
 Mezra
 Mollacelil
 Mollakulaç
 Mutluca
 Ortaköy
 Ovaçevirme
 Ovakozlu
 Parmaksız
 Pınar
 Pınarbaşı
 Saltepe
 Sanayi
 Sarılı
 Sıldız
 Söğütlü
 Sultanlı
 Suvaran
 Şahabettin
 Şahverdi
 Şalgam
 Tanır
 Tapu
 Taşbudak
 Tellitepe
 Tipideresi
 Toprakkale
 Toraman
 Uluçayır
 Uyanık
 Ünlüce
 Yamanlar
 Yaylakonak
 Yelpiz
 Yenikent
 Yeniköy
 Yeşilbahçe
 Yeşilyazı
 Yolüstü
 Yukarı Kayabaşı

References

Populated places in Erzurum Province
Towns in Turkey
Kurdish settlements in Turkey